Jamie J. Caleb (born October 29, 1936) is an American former gridiron football player who played for the Hamilton Tiger-Cats of the Canadian Football League (CFL) and the Minnesota Vikings and Cleveland Browns of the National Football League (CFL). He won the Grey Cup with the Tiger-Cats in 1963. He played college football at Grambling State University and was drafted in the 1959 NFL draft by Cleveland (Round 16, #191 overall). Caleb, a fullback, joined the Philadelphia Bulldogs of the Continental Football League and because of injuries, he was also pressed into action as the place kicker. In the 1966 Continental Football League Championship Game at Temple Stadium in Philadelphia, he kicked the winning field goal for the Bulldogs to win the CFL Championship.

References

1936 births
Living people
American football fullbacks
American football halfbacks
Cleveland Browns players
Grambling State Tigers football players
Hamilton Tiger-Cats players
Minnesota Vikings players
People from Calhoun, Louisiana
Players of American football from Louisiana
African-American players of American football
African-American players of Canadian football
21st-century African-American people
20th-century African-American sportspeople